is a railway station located in the town of Tsuruta, Aomori Prefecture, Japan, operated by the East Japan Railway Company (JR East).

Lines

Station layout
Tsurudomari Station has one ground-level side platform serving a single bi-directional track. The station building is unattended.

History
Tsurudomari Station was opened on September 25, 1918 as a station on the Mutsu Railway. It became a station on the Japan National Railways (JNR) when the Mutsu Railway was nationalized on June 1, 1927. With the privatization of the JNR on April 1, 1987, it came under the operational control of JR East. Tsurudomari Station is a simple consignment station, administered by Goshogawara Station, and operated by JA Itayanagi.

Surrounding area

See also
 List of Railway Stations in Japan

References

External links

  

Stations of East Japan Railway Company
Railway stations in Aomori Prefecture
Gonō Line
Tsuruta, Aomori
Railway stations in Japan opened in 1918